The Petroleum Royalties (Relief) Act 1983 (c. 59) is an Act of the Parliament of the United Kingdom which exempted certain petroleum licence holders of new offshore oil and gas fields from the payment of petroleum royalties or the delivery of petroleum.

Background 
In the Budget statement in 1983 the Chancellor of the Exchequer announced changes to the taxation in the oil industry. He noted that Government had a responsibility to compare the likely returns from future development both to the Government and to the industry, and had to ensure that the country obtained the appropriate benefit.

The demarcation line between the direct benefit to the nation and the benefit to the oil and gas industry work was such that, after the Budget measures and taxation proposals and the measures in this Act the nation would obtain the majority of the benefit. Petroleum revenue tax was 75 per cent, and corporation tax was 52 per cent. The measures in this Act meant that benefit from other discoveries and developments will benefit the nation as a whole. As a result of the application of royalties for future developments outside the southern basin of the North Sea, the marginal tax rate for a field paying petroleum revenue tax will be reduced from 89.5 to 88 per cent.

Oil production increased and the Government's revenue from North Sea taxation in 1984/5 was £12 billion or 8 per cent of total tax revenue.

In response to the oil price fall in 1986 the Government reduced taxation further by enacting the Advance Petroleum Revenue Tax Act 1986.

Petroleum Royalties (Relief) Act 1983 
The Petroleum Royalties (Relief) Act 1983 (1983 chapter 59) received Royal Assent on 21 December 1983. Its long title is ‘An Act to confer on holders of petroleum production licences an exemption from royalties (including royalties in kind) in respect of petroleum from certain new fields off the coast of Great Britain.’

Provisions 
The Act comprises two Sections:

 Section 1. Royalty exemption for petroleum from certain new offshore fields.
 Section 2. Short title, commencement and extent.

Subsequent legislation  
Section 1 of the 1983 Act was extended by Petroleum Royalties (Relief) and Continental Shelf Act 1989 (c. 1)

Section 1 of the 1983 Act was amended by Petroleum Act 1998 (c. 17)

See also 

 Oil and gas industry in the United Kingdom
 North Sea Oil
 Petroleum Act

References 
"Petroleum Royalties (Relief) Act 1983". Halsbury's Statutes of England and Wales. Fourth Edition. 2009 Reissue. LexisNexis. Volume 17(1). Pages 714 and 715.
"The Petroleum Royalties (Relief) Act 1983". Halsbury's Statutes of England. Third Edition. Butterworths. London. 1984. Volume 53 (Continuation Volume 1983). Pages 896 and 897. See also pages 654, 1356 and 1410.
Peter Allsop (ed). "Petroleum Royalties (Relief) Act 1983". Current Law Statutes Annotated 1983. Sweet & Maxwell. Stevens & Sons. London. W Green & Son. Edinburgh. 1984. Chapter 59. Pages 59/1 and 59/2.
Is it in Force? 2003. Butterworths. 2003. Page 140.
"Petroleum Royalties (Relief) Act 1983" (1984) 103 Law Notes 41 (February 1984)
W P Winston. Petroleum Law Guide 1985. Elsevier Applied Science Publishers. Page 40.
Bernhard Taverne. An Introduction to the Regulation of the Petroleum Industry. 1994. Page 55. Google Books.
Gordon, Paterson and Üşenmez. Oil and Gas Law: Current Practice and Emerging Trends. Second Edition. 2011. Reprinted 2014. Paragraph 6.4 at pages 138 and 139.
Terence Daintith and Leigh Hancher. Energy Strategy in Europe: The Legal Framework. Walter de Gruyter. Berlin. New York. 1986. Page 119.
Taylor and Winsor on Joint Operating Agreements. Second Edition. Longman. 1992. Page iii.
John Pointon and Derek Spratley. Principles of Business Taxation. Clarendon Press. 1988. Page 260. Google Books.

United Kingdom Acts of Parliament 1983
History of the petroleum industry in the United Kingdom